Eridantes erigonoides is a species of dwarf spider in the family Linyphiidae. It is found in the USA.

References

Further reading

 
 
 

Linyphiidae
Spiders described in 1882